Canadian Baptist Ministries (CBM) or Ministères Baptistes Canadiens is a federation of four regional Baptist denominations in Canada.  The federation is a member of the Baptist World Alliance. The headquarter is in Mississauga, Ontario.

History
The first Baptist church in what is now Canada was founded by an American pastor in Sackville, New Brunswick in 1763. More churches were founded throughout Nova Scotia, New Brunswick, Lower Canada, and Upper Canada by American pastors and itinerant preachers.

Mission Boards
The first Baptist born in Canada sent out as a missionary was Samuel S. Day, who was born in Upper Canada, and sent to India by the American Baptist Missionary Union (ABMU) in 1835. In 1866, A.V. Timpany was also appoint by the ABMU to go to India, and that prompted the creation of a Canadian auxiliary to the ABMU in 1866. In 1869, the Canadian auxiliary was reorganised as the Regular Baptist Foreign Missionary Society of Canada, and in 1889, the name was changed to The Board of Foreign Missions of the regular Baptist Convention of Ontario and Quebec.

Meanwhile, Baptist Churches in the Maritime colonies had been supporting the work of Adoniram Judson in Burma since 1814. In 1845, the Churches sent out Rev. R.E. Burpee and his wife Laleah to Burma, also under the auspices of the ABMU. The Maritime Baptist Convention formed a Foreign Mission Board in 1865.

In 1874, the Canadian Baptist Foreign Missionary Society was founded in Ontario.

The Canadian Baptist Foreign Mission Board (CBFMB) was founded in 1912. The Canadian Baptist Foreign Mission Board was renamed to Canadian Baptist Overseas Missions Board (CBOMB) on May 1, 1970. The Canadian Baptist Overseas Missions Board was renamed again to Canadian Baptist International Ministries (CBIM) in 1990.

National Federation
Efforts to form a national Baptist body date back to 1900.  In 1900, delegates from across Canada met in Winnipeg and formed the National Baptist Convention of Canada. Inexplicably, it never met again.  As such, no national coordinating body of Baptists existed in Canada until the Baptist Federation of Canada was organized at Saint John, New Brunswick in 1944. The Baptist Convention of Ontario and Quebec, the Baptist Union of Western Canada, and the United Baptist Convention of the Maritimes (now Canadian Baptists of Atlantic Canada) initiated the Federation and were joined by l'Union d'Églises Baptistes Françaises au Canada in 1970. It was renamed Canadian Baptist Federation (CBF) in 1982.

Merger
In 1995, the "Canadian Baptist Federation" merged with the "Canadian Baptist International Ministries" to form the Canadian Baptist Ministries.

Statistics
According to a denomination census released in 2020, it claimed 982 churches and 81,792 members.

Humanitarian aid

CBM support humanitarian projects in Canada and worldwide.

It engages in international mission on behalf of Canadian Baptist churches and brokers national cooperation among the four regional denominations and Women's groups.

Structure 
It has 4 regional unions of churches : Canadian Baptists of Ontario and Quebec, Canadian Baptists of Western Canada, the Canadian Baptists of Atlantic Canada and Union d'Églises baptistes francophones du Canada.

Education 
The organization has several theological institutes affiliated and a partner university, Crandall University.

Beliefs
The denomination has a Baptist confession of faith. It is affiliated with the Baptist World Alliance.

See also

 Canadian Baptist Mission
 McMaster Divinity College, Hamilton, Ontario
 Carey Theological College, Vancouver
 Convention of Baptist Churches of Northern Circars
 Andhra Christian Theological College, Andhra Pradesh, India
 Baptists in Canada

References
Notes

Sources
Baptists Around the World, by Albert W. Wardin, Jr.
Program & Report Book, Canadian Baptist Ministries
From Sea to Sea: The Canadian Baptist Federation 1944- 1994, by Shirley Bentall
The Baptist Heritage: Four Centuries of Baptist Witness, by H. Leon McBeth

Further reading

External links
Canadian Baptist Ministries - official Web Site
The Canadian Baptist Archives

 
Baptist Ministries
Christian organizations established in 1995
Baptist organizations established in the 20th century
Baptist denominations in North America